Raja Haji Fisabilillah (full name Raja Haji Fisabilillah ibni Daeng Chelak) (1727–1784) was a Bugis warrior, and also the Yang Dipertuan Muda (Crown Prince) of the Johor-Riau Sultanate from 1777 to 1784.

Early life
Born in Ulusungai, Riau in 1727, he was a younger brother of Raja Lumu (who later became Sultan Salehuddin Shah of Selangor) and his grandchild, Raja Ali Haji bin Raja Haji Ahmad bin Raja Haji Fisabilillah would be later became a renowned historian, poet, and scholar.

Death and burial
Raja Haji led a series of raids on A Famosa, a Dutch fortress in Melacca. On the verge of victory after surrounding the Dutch forces in one of her forts, he was, however, shot from a distance, killing him instantly. He died in 1784 at Teluk Ketapang, Melaka in modern-day Malaysia.

According to famed Malayan writer Munshi Abdullah, Raja Haji was rumoured to have been buried in a pig farm by the Dutch.

It was not until the Englishmen conquered Melacca, the royal family requested Raja Haji's body to be removed from the pig farm. He was subsequently given a proper Muslim burial at Pulau Penyengat, Indera Sakti, Riau.

The effect of the war has infuriated his nephew, Raja Ibrahim, as it has caused Selangor to be involved non-directly in the war between the Dutch and Johor.

Legacy
His bravery was remembered by the Indonesians, as the Indonesian Government has posthumously proclaimed him as the "Pahlawan Nasional Indonesia" (National Hero of Indonesia), and an Raja Haji Fisabilillah Airport was renamed in honor of him in 2008.

In Malaysia, there is a mosque in Cyberjaya in the state of Selangor, Raja Haji Fisabilillah Mosque was named after him.

References

1727 births
1784 deaths
Bugis people
History of Johor
National Heroes of Indonesia
18th-century Indonesian people